JDS Yūshio (SS-573) was the lead boat of the. She was commissioned on 7 March 1978.

Construction and career
Yūshio was laid down at Mitsubishi Heavy Industries Kobe Shipyard on 14 April 1975 and launched on 19 May 1977. She was commissioned on 7 March 1978, into the 1st Submarine Group.

On 5 March 1981, she was transferred to the 1st Submarine Group, which was newly commissioned under the 1st Submarine Group, along with JDS Mochishio, who was commissioned on the same day.

Around 2:00 am on 12 May 1984, while sailing with a periscope off the south coast of Cape Muroto, she came into contact with the bottom of the Indian-flagged ore carrier Satya Kairash (42,198 tons) sailing to Higashiharima Port in Hyogo Prefecture and had a built-in sonar. Causes an accident that damages to the ore carrier's underside tank.

On 1 August 1996, she was reclassified as an auxiliary submarine, her hull number was changed to ATSS-8006, and she became a ship under the direct control of the 1st Submarine Group.

She was decommissioned on 11 March 1999.

Citations

1979 ships
Yūshio-class submarines
Ships built by Mitsubishi Heavy Industries